Camille O'Sullivan is an Irish musician, vocalist, and actress. O'Sullivan is known for her unique, dramatic musical style and covers of artists such as Radiohead, Tom Waits, and David Bowie. As an actress, O'Sullivan has appeared in Mrs Henderson Presents, Rebellion (miniseries), and Pick Ups.

Early life
O'Sullivan was born in London, England, to Denis O'Sullivan, an Irish racing driver and World Champion sailor, and Marie-José, a French artist. She was raised in the town of Passage West, County Cork. After finishing secondary school, O'Sullivan studied Fine Art at the National College of Art and Design in Dublin. She dropped out of her course after a year because she felt "if I study any more that might kill my love for it." On her parents' advice, she enrolled in University College Dublin and studied architecture for four years. Whilst in UCD, she became known as "the singing architect" as she performed in all available university productions and was a member of Dramsoc.

O'Sullivan took a year off from her studies and moved to Berlin, Germany, where she worked at an architect's office. During her time in Berlin, she regularly attended local cabaret clubs and began listening to the narrative music of Hanns Eisler, Kurt Weill and Friedrich Hollaender. Upon returning to Ireland, she met Agnes Bernelle, a mentor who encouraged her to sing, saying "to do this right, you have to be a better actress than a singer, it's all about the story." She graduated from University College Dublin with first class honours and the highest marks at the university in a decade. O'Sullivan then continued to work as an architect, winning an Architectural Association of Ireland award in the process, while continuing to perform in local clubs at night.

Career

In 1999, O'Sullivan was involved in a near-fatal car crash, in which she suffered a head fracture, her pelvis was fractured in six places, her hips displaced and the tendons in her hand were shredded. It was months before she could walk again, and she was hospitalised for a year; she still has a metal plate in her pelvis . The accident encouraged her to follow her dream of singing and she performed her first show after the accident while still in crutches.

O'Sullivan is not a classically trained singer or musician, although she plays piano, and has stated that this stopped her from having the confidence to begin a singing career for many years. In her early career she got around this lack of experience by working with musicians who were able to adapt to her singing style, which focuses more on acting, emotion and 'light and shade', than technique or strict tempo.

O'Sullivan has performed in sell-out seasons in Ireland, New York, the UK, Australia (including the Sydney Opera House) with her award-winning shows and also with the ensemble off Broadway hit show and Olivier Award-winning La Clique. She has performed her 'Dark Angel' show for a six-week West End run at the Apollo Theatre, the Roundhouse, and Royal Festival Hall and appeared in Hal Willner's Rogues Gallery with Tim Robbins, Marianne Faithfull, Sarah Blasko and Todd Rundgren at the Sydney Festival 2010.  In December 2009 she supported Jools Holland on tour including the Royal Albert Hall.

After being spotted by Ewen Bremner (Spud from Trainspotting) in La Clique in The Famous Spiegeltent, O'Sullivan co-starred as the vaudeville star Jane in the film Mrs Henderson Presents, directed by Stephen Frears, opposite Dame Judi Dench and Bob Hoskins. She and Will Young are also on the soundtrack to the movie. She has appeared on stage with Damien Rice, Jack L, Duke Special, Tim Robbins and Shane MacGowan.

As much storyteller as singer, Camille has received acclaim for her dark dramatic interpretations of the songs of Jacques Brel, Nick Cave, Tom Waits, Dillie Keane, Kurt Weill, David Bowie, and Radiohead. The productions 'La Fille Du Cirque','The Dark Angel' and 'Chameleon" were self-directed with the emphasis on inhabiting the character of each story, revealing different aspects emotionally dark and light, lending to her chameleon like quality on stage.  In her early days Camille concentrated on more traditional 'narrative storytelling' with Eisler, Weill and chanteuse fayre Edith Piaf and says that she may have alienated some by making the switch to interpreting darker contemporary songs which originated, in the most part, from male artists:

"I feel it’s necessary to not just do things to please", she says. "I sometimes worried about that in the past. I thought, 'If I don’t want to alienate people, I shouldn’t perform difficult provocative dark songs'. But I would have given up if I’d stayed doing Dietrich and Piaf in a studied way, that cafe-cabaret version, where you’re making it easy instead of pushing yourself".

In 1994, she performed in 'Jacques Brel is Alive and Well and Living in Paris' at University College, Dublin which increased her passion for Brel's work, in particular the songs Amsterdam and Next, the latter being one of the climactic moments of her Spiegletent 2007 performance at the Edinburgh Festival Fringe, and both appearing on her 'Fille Du Cirque' album.

Both of these songs are told from a male perspective, with Next ('Au Suivant') telling the story of a young soldier who loses his virginity in a 'mobile army whorehouse, gift from the army, free of cost' and is haunted for the remainder of his life both by the horrors of war and by his disgust for the sexual experiences. However, O'Sullivan is not deterred from performing them, commenting that she sings them in the lowest key possible for her voice to retain the drama and tone of the originals, while finding a character within the song that she can inhabit, such as the prostitute and sailor in 'Amsterdam'.

In 2007 Camille played 'Beggar Woman' in the 'Best Opera Production' of 2007 (Irish Times Irish Theatre Award), Sondheim's 'Sweeney Todd' at The Gate Theatre, Dublin ("This production is a miracle…gripping and musically brilliant" Guardian).  In 2011 she starred in, and co-created (with director Elizabeth Freestone and long term musical collaborator Feargal Murray), a one-woman adaptation of Shakespeare's narrative poem The Rape of Lucrece, which was performed at the Swan Theatre, Stratford upon Avon.  Commissioned by the Royal Shakespeare Company, the poem is a harrowing account, in which Camille portrays both protagonist and victim.  Original music was written by O'Sullivan and Murray.  In Autumn 2011 she starred opposite Lorcan Crannitch in The Lulu House for the Dublin Theatre Festival, directed by Selina Cartmell.

Festival appearances include the Acoustic Tent at Glastonbury Festival 2008, Latitude Festival 2009 and 2011, and the Tent Stage (as headline) at the London Feis 2011.  She has performed on Later With Jools 2008 and was interviewed by David Frost 2010. Tribute performances include Barbican's Nick Drake tribute, Way to Blue 2009 with Martha Wainwright, Vashti Bunyan, Harper Simon, Stuart Murdoch and Blur's Graham Coxon, Barbican's Brel evening with Marc Almond, Momus, Arno and Arthur H.  She is regularly one of the biggest sellers at the Edinburgh Fringe with 4-week runs in some of the biggest venues.

Style

Camille's performance style is intensely dramatic, drawing the audience into the stories and characters of the songs.  Sometimes playful, sometimes with a 5 or 6 piece band, sometimes a cappella – as in her version of Brel's Amsterdam – or accompanied just by piano and taking everything down to a whisper for an emotional song like Dillie Keane's Look Mummy or Nick Cave's Little Water Song or Ship Song.  Camille famously sips red wine throughout her performances, attributing this characteristic to her Irish roots.

O'Sullivan has become a popular commodity in advertising and the media, particularly in Ireland, where she advertised Hennessy Cognac under the 'Pure Character' campaign, with the tagline 'Singing in English, French and sometimes German, I like to become different characters, showing each part of myself whether vulnerable, angry, harsh or fun' and titling her 'Camille O'Sullivan – Performer'. She has appeared on the cover of Time Out London,the Sunday Independent's 'Life' Magazine twice, once for an article named 'My Fall into Decadence', and the other time,'Dublin's Dens of Desire'

She suffers from stage fright before every performance, saying "if you can use pure nerves as a fuse you can really take off like a rocket."

Irish Tatler Woman of the Year Award (November 2011); nominated for Best Irish Female Music Artist Award in the Irish Music Meteor Awards (February 2009); Olivier Award for Best Entertainment (as ensemble in la Clique)(2009); Best Show Dublin Fringe Festival (2007, 2009); Spirit of the Edinburgh Fringe (2007); Best Music Brighton Festival (2005,2006); Best Artist Melbourne Theatre Awards (2005)

Her second studio album, Changeling is released 2012.

Discography

Studio albums
A Little Yearning (2002)
Changeling (2012)

Live albums
La Fille Du Cirque (2005)
Plays Brel Live (2005)
Live at the Olympia (2008)
Camille Sings Cave Live (2019)

Personal life
O'Sullivan was in a relationship with The Waterboys' lead singer Mike Scott, with whom she has a daughter, Lila-Elodie. Since 2014, she has been in a relationship with actor Aidan Gillen.

See also
Multi-instrumentalist
List of Irish musicians

References

External links
 Camille O'Sullivan on Later... with Jools Holland (BBC2 TV) – with Kirsty MacColl's In These Shoes
 Camille O'Sullivan on Later... with Jools Holland (BBC2 TV) – with Nick Cave's God is in the House 
 
 Review of Camille O'Sullivan – The Dark Angel at Edinburgh Festival Fringe 2009
 Official website
 BBC Feature on La Clique and Camille
 Sweeney Todd at The Gate Theatre
  Irish Music Meteor Awards

Irish architects
Irish film actresses
Irish women singers
Irish people of French descent
Irish multi-instrumentalists
Irish musical theatre actresses
Helpmann Award winners
Living people
Musicians from Cork (city)
Year of birth missing (living people)